Souvenir of Their Visit to America is an EP of music by English rock band the Beatles. Released on 23 March 1964, it is the first of three Beatles EPs released in the United States and the only one released by Vee-Jay Records. The EP features four songs that had previously been released by Vee-Jay on their Introducing... The Beatles album. This EP did not chart.

Context
Capitol Records, a unit of EMI and sister label to the Beatles' record label Parlophone, had first refusal rights to any material released by an EMI label. Capitol in the US repeatedly turned down the Beatles for most of 1963, so the Beatles' first two singles of that year, as well as an altered version of their British debut album Please Please Me, were released by Vee-Jay Records. Vee-Jay was a small company with few resources, and as a result of little publicity or promotion, the records sold poorly. Vee-Jay lost the rights to the Beatles' music over nonpayment of royalties, and the smaller Swan Records received the rights to issue the "She Loves You" single. 

After the Beatles were booked to perform on the popular Ed Sullivan Show in February 1964, Capitol finally exercised its option and signed a deal with the Beatles in November 1963. In a legal settlement with Capitol, Vee-Jay received rights to market the Beatles recordings they possessed until 10 October 1964, at which point all rights to all EMI Beatle recordings in the United States would be assigned to Capitol Records. 

Souvenir of Their Visit to America was a great success and is by far the most common Beatles EP of all the US releases. However, because part of the EP's sales were through mail-order offers, the trade magazines refused to chart it.

Track listing

External links
The Beatles on Vee-Jay Records

1964 EPs
Albums produced by George Martin
The Beatles EPs
Vee-Jay Records EPs